Estádio Imbomdeiro is a multi-use stadium in Soyo, Angola.  It is currently used mostly for football matches and serves as the home of Académica Petróleo Kwanda Soyo.  The stadium holds 3,000 people.

References

Imbomdeiro
Soyo